Mount Hiru (蛭ヶ岳 Hiru-ga-take) is the tallest mountain of the Tanzawa Mountains with a height of .

Gallery

References

 Mapple Yamachizu 

Hiru